Septocellula is an extinct genus of fly in the family Dolichopodidae. It contains only one species, Septocellula asiatica, from the Eocene of China.

References

 

†
†
Prehistoric Diptera genera
†
Eocene insects